The seventh generation of the BMW 3 Series range consists of the BMW G20 (sedan version) and BMW G21 (wagon version, marketed as 'Touring') compact executive cars. The G20/G21 has been in production since mid-October 2018 with a facelift in July 2022 and is often collectively referred to as the G20.

The M340i, one of the first models in the range became available for sale in the spring of 2019, with the 330e plug-in hybrid model scheduled for launch in 2020. The 3 Series Gran Turismo fastback body style was discontinued for the G20 generation.

For the G20 generation, BMW has begun production in Mexico for various world markets including the US, replacing the Rosslyn plant in South Africa where the previous F30 generation vehicles were assembled.

Development and launch 
At the end of November 2015, a final design proposal for the successor of the F30 3 Series by Alexey Kezha out of 3 total, was chosen by BMW management, as reported by Auto Bild in October 2015. The new 3 Series, internally called the G20, was unveiled at the 2018 Paris Motor Show on October 2, 2018, and was available for sale in March 2019.

The G20 3 Series is based on the Cluster Architecture (CLAR) platform and features increased use of high-strength steel and aluminium. The G20 has a MacPherson strut front suspension and multi-link rear suspension, with a hydraulic damping system to better absorb impacts.

The G20 has a flat and covered underbody, resulting in a reduced drag coefficient from 0.26  to 0.23  for the 320d. Compared to its predecessor, the G20 is  lighter,  longer, and  wider. The car retains a 50:50 weight distribution and has a 50% increase in body rigidity.

The windshield uses double-glazed acoustic glass and the A-pillars have increased insulation. The handbrake is now electronically operated and no longer uses a manual lever. Engine coasting is also now available in both Eco Pro and Comfort modes, and both petrol and diesel models receive engine particulate filters.

The 320d, 320i, 330d, 330i and M340i are available in both rear-wheel drive and all-wheel drive (xDrive) variants. BMW India stated that it would begin deliveries of the M340i X Drive in January 2023.

The Touring variant (G21) was launched on 12 June 2019.

Later, a less expensive variant, called the 320Li, was introduced. The right hand drive LWB variant in India, the 330Li, is scheduled for release by 2021 to replace the 3 GT. The 330Li uses a 2.0 liter turbocharged engine making 258 hp. This version was subsequently released in selected Southeast Asian markets like Thailand and Malaysia, complementing the existing standard-wheelbase variants already sold there.

An electric version for the Chinese market is scheduled for release by 2023.

Equipment 
The G20 is available in Advantage, Sport Line, Luxury Line, or M Sport package.

Standard equipment includes full LED headlights and tail-lights, automatic climate control, automatic headlights and rain-sensing wipers, 40:20:40 split folding rear seats, and driver assistance systems including lane departure warning and collision warning with braking intervention.

All models (except when fitted with the plug-in hybrid drivetrain) feature iDrive 6.0 with an 8.8-inch display and a hybrid instrument cluster called "Live Cockpit Plus" as standard. The system can be upgraded to iDrive 7.0 with a 10.25-inch display and 12.3-inch digital instrument cluster called "Live Cockpit Professional" with plug-in hybrid models receiving it as standard equipment. iDrive 7.0 has over-the-air updates for the navigational maps and operating system, and features a voice-controlled digital assistant that can be activated by saying "Hey BMW". The assistant can control in-car functions and is integrated with Microsoft Office 365 and Skype for Business. From mid-2020 the Live Cockpit Plus system was upgraded to the same iDrive 7.0 system as in the Live Cockpit Professional, with the instrument cluster reverted to the traditional analog gauges style and the 8.8-inch display remained the same as the iDrive 6.0-based system. The engine start stop system uses the navigation system to prevent unnecessary engine shutdowns.

Optional equipment includes the BMW LaserLight, a BMW display key, self-righting wheel center caps, and a Welcome Light Carpet. A Digital Key system enables a smartphone to lock or unlock the vehicle using near-field communication, and will start the engine when placed in the wireless charging tray. The optional parking assistant system displays a three-dimensional 360 degree view of the car and its surroundings, which can also be remotely viewed in the BMW ConnectedDrive app.

318–330 models with the M Sport package and M340 models can be fitted with M Performance Parts. This includes a splitter, lip spoiler, tailpipes, sport brakes, darker taillights and more carbon fibre parts.

Only 318d and selected 320d models are available with a 6-speed manual transmission, though in some markets the 318i is also available with it.

BMW had controversially implemented a yearly fee for access to Apple CarPlay, a feature built into the car, and for which BMW pays no yearly fee or other ongoing expense. As of December 2019 it is reported that this fee will no longer be charged as BMW has backtracked on this decision.

Facelift 
A facelift (LCI) was announced in May 2022 for the seventh generation BMW 3 Series.

The updated model has new front and rear bumpers, new headlights and a slightly tweaked grille. The headlights have a new "inverted L shape" DRL signature (that is now standard on all models) and the top Laserlight option is replaced by new adaptive LED units with matrix high beam functionality. The grille maintains its overall proportions while the bumper gets new designs for both the base version and the M Sport package. Both feature new side air curtains, while the latter has a larger central intake (although part of it serves for design purposes only) and more aggressive styling. Tail lights carry the same design as the 2019 model, but are complemented by newly designed bumpers. The base version features body coloured graphics, while the M Sport has a large, gloss-black element that incorporates a faux diffuser and two vertically arranged reflectors.

The interior gets a significant update, with the dashboard being shaped by a new dual curved display that comes as standard and features iDrive with BMW Operating System 8.

The ZF 8-speed automatic transmission is also fitted as standard, replacing the 6-speed manual entirely, and a new gear selector lever is also present.

Engines

Petrol engines

Diesel engines

M3 Model 

The M3 model was released 2021. All-wheel drive (xDrive) is optional on the G80 M3, marking it the first time that a M3 has not exclusively used a rear-wheel drive layout. A manual transmission is only available on rear-wheel drive models.

BMW announced the launch of the first-ever M3 Touring in June 2022. Codenamed G81, it will be available along the sedan G80, the coupé M4 G82 and convertible M4 G83.

The M3 is powered by the  BMW S58 straight-six engine that debuted in the G01 X3 M.

Safety

Euro NCAP
The 2019 3 Series scored five stars overall in its Euro NCAP test.

IIHS

The 2022 BMW 3 Series was tested by the IIHS and its top trim received a Top Safety Pick award:

Awards 
 2018 Auto Bild Allrad "AWD Car of the Year up to €40,000" award
 2018 Auto Zeitung "World's Best Car" in the midsize category
 2018 Car Magazine "Best Buys" in the premium midsize category
 2019 What Car? "Best Executive Car" award
2019 Car Sales "Car of the Year" award

Gallery

References

External links 

 

G20
3 Series
Compact executive cars
Euro NCAP large family cars
Cars introduced in 2018
2020s cars